Mount Donaldson is a mountain, 5 nautical miles (9 km) north-northeast of the summit of Flat Top and west of the head of Ludeman Glacier in the Commonwealth Range in Antarctica. It forms the northern end of the Flat Top massif. It was discovered and named by the British Antarctic Expedition (1907–09).

Donaldson, Mount